Margaret J. Mitchell (1869–1952) was an American writer, the dietician of Manhattan State Hospital, New York, and director of domestic science, Drexel Institute, Philadelphia.

She is the author of two books: The Fireless Cook Book: A Manual of the Construction and Use of Appliances for Cooking by Retained Heat, and Cereal Foods and Their Preparation.

References 

1860 births
1952 deaths
20th-century American writers
20th-century American women writers
Dietitians